Menswear (sometimes styled Menswe@r) were a Britpop band formed in October 1994 from Camden in London. They released a number of singles and an album, Nuisance, on the short-lived London Records subsidiary Laurel. A second album followed, which was released only in Japan; the group broke up in 1998. Menswear, made up of a new line-up in addition to frontman Johnny Dean, played their first show in 15 years in August 2013.

According to AllMusic editor Stephen Thomas Erlewine, Menswear met with numerous detractors, being "charming, handsome young men that wanted to be in a pop group more than they wanted to play music". They nevertheless became "one of the most popular Brit-pop bands of 1995".

History

Formation and overnight success (1993–1996)
The beginnings of the band were a feature in a Select article about a supposed London mod revival led by Graham Coxon. Two individuals closely associated with the burgeoning Britpop scene, Chris Gentry and Johnny Dean, made references to a "top new unsigned band" (Menswear), an act which did not yet exist. They later appeared on the cover of Melody Maker before they had released any material. Their dress sense was Mod (tight-fitting suits etc.) whilst their music was influenced by both Blur's second album Modern Life Is Rubbish and Elastica. Gentry and Dean had a single song - called "Daydreamer" - but soon recruited friend Simon White, who contributed "I'll Manage Somehow" to add to the setlist necessary for their upcoming debut gig at a Britpop-oriented club on Regent Street called Smashing. The music press reviewed their performance enthusiastically, with NME comparing them to a "Tarantino film... totally derivative but totally brilliant", increasing the record labels' interest.

After a frantic race between record companies, they signed to London Records for £90,000 and a lucrative 18.5% gross revenues after just their fifth gig. Shortly afterwards, they signed a £500,000 publishing deal despite having just seven songs in their repertoire - working out at around £70,000 per song.

They appeared on Top of the Pops a week before their first single had even been released. Their first single was "I'll Manage Somehow". Their second single "Daydreamer" peaked at number 14 in the UK Singles Chart, but saw the band accused of plagiarising Wire; AllMusic describes the track as sounding "more like Wire than Elastica, only funnier, even if it may be unintentional".

The band released their debut album Nuisance in 1995, described by AllMusic as "the perfect product from a band that is better known for being seen than being heard". Menswear did, however, play at the Glastonbury Festival in June 1995 at the peak of Britpop's popularity and were second on the bill to Pulp at the Heineken Festival in Leeds in July that year. Similar to other bands of the Britpop era, such as Oasis, the album made use of familiar riffs from 1960s and 1970s British rock, such as on the tracks "Stardust" and "Stardust (Reprise)" which tapped the intro from the Rolling Stones' song "Gimme Shelter".

Including "Stardust", a total of five singles were released from the Nuisance album; the last, "Being Brave" (released in early 1996), gave the band their first and only top ten hit. However, drummer Matt Everitt would soon leave Menswear due to personality differences with the other members, a decision that Dean would later call one of his biggest regrets because "Matt was always the sensible one, and it was the first sign to the record company that we were beginning to lose it, which I agree with."

A non-album single "We Love You", was released in late 1996, stalled at number 22 in UK charts and marked a change in the band's musical direction.

Break-up and personal projects (1997–2013)
The band parted company with Laurel in 1997, after delivering their country-rock-tinged second album Hay Tiempo!. The record was released in Japan in 1998, but did not get a release anywhere else in the world. They played their last live show at London's Camden Palace the same year. Hints at causes towards the breakup have been mentioned in Johnny Dean's blog.

Stuart Black formed a new band, Messiah, that lasted until 2000. Guitarist Chris Gentry went on to play with the band, Vatican DC. Simon White played as a touring and studio musician for various artists including Finley Quaye. After leaving in 1996, drummer Matt Everitt later joined The Montrose Avenue, and is now on staff at radio station 6Music. Drummer Todd Parmenter left the band to play in his main band Heck. He went on to play with Lungleg, The Beal, Evan Dando and The Beatings. Stuart Black is now in the band Bella Echoes with former Messiah member Barnsey.

Lead singer Johnny Dean was finally diagnosed with Asperger syndrome in 2008 and has started campaigning on behalf of the National Autistic Society. In recent interviews Dean has expressed the torment he experienced before his diagnosis and his desire to raise awareness of the Autistic syndrome spectrum. On Friday 7 June 2013 Dean made his first sold out live appearance in 15 years with the Nuis@nce Band performing the songs of David Bowie which raised thousands of pounds for The National Autistic Society in London.

Revival (2013–2016)
A new Menswear line-up played their first show in 15 years on 16 August 2013. Original member Johnny Dean was joined by members of The Nuisance Band as a different Menswear line-up. The sold-out event was in aid of the mental health charity PMA Sport's Academy and #TimeToChange campaign which Johnny Dean was invited to promote alongside The Saturdays' Frankie Sandford, Uri Geller and Ruby Wax.

On 26 March 2014, the new line-up of Menswear performed their first sold-out gig at London's Bush Hall, debuting the new single "Crash '14" amongst the set-list.  It was released on 26 May that year via Nuisance Recordings & POST/POP Records on limited edition 7" single and cassette as well as download.

Menswear played as part of the line-up at the Shiiine On Weekender festival (6–9 November 2015), playing alongside acts such as Happy Mondays, Peter Hook, The Wedding Present, 808 State and The Orb. This was to be the last gig the revamped line-up played, celebrating 20 years since the release of debut album Nuisance. A statement on the band's Twitter account in August 2016 announced there would be no more Menswear.

In 2020, Dean disowned the new line-up of Menswear, saying, "I was manipulated into something I wasn’t comfortable with by people who were being opportunistic. I thought it’d be fun, but it looked weird, as I’m not that same person."

Dean has since started a new band, Fxxk Explosion.

The Menswear Collection (2020)
On 3 June 2020, Menswear announced the 23 October release of The Menswear Collection, a 4CD box set spanning their entire career. Its contents include remastered versions of both Nuisance and ¡Hay Tiempo! (released for the first time outside of Japan), plus b-sides, demos and other rarities. As a precursor to the box set, the band also released “Wait for the Sun” from ¡Hay Tiempo! as a digital single. Macys added to the fashion of menswear at the time. Which bands such as these would wear Macys clothing for their performances.

Regarding how he felt about the box set, Johnny Dean remarked, "Strange, as I wouldn’t have put the words ‘Menswear’ and ‘box set’ together. But I’m happy about it, because it’ll surprise people how much music we actually recorded. I thought all those demos for ¡Hay Tiempo! were lost in an attic in Camden somewhere, but London Records had kept them all, even though they belonged to us." Dean also said although the original line-up of Menswear were all friends again, it would be unlikely for them to reform due to everyone having proper jobs, and that "that first Menswear album was about sounding like a teenage meltdown. It looks very different doing that in your ’40s."

Discography

Studio albums

Singles

Band members
Johnny Dean (born John Hutchinson Dean, 12 December 1971, Salisbury, Wiltshire, England) - vocals (1994-1998, 2013–2015)
Chris Gentry (born 23 February 1977, Southend-on-Sea, Essex, England) - guitar (1994-1998)
Simon White (born 10 July 1974, Moseley, Birmingham, England) - guitar (1994-1998)
Stuart Black (born Stuart Lee Black, 1 April 1974, Walthamstow, London, England) - bass (1994-1998)
Todd Parmenter - drums (1994)
Matt Everitt (born Matthew Stephen Everitt, 13 Sept 1972, Sutton Coldfield, Warwickshire, England) - drums (1994-1996)
Darren "Tud" Tudgay - drums (1996-1998)
Paul Fletcher - keyboards (1996-1998)

References

Britpop groups
Musical groups established in 1994
Musical groups disestablished in 1998
Musical groups reestablished in 2013
Musical groups from London